Kerogen is solid, insoluble organic matter in sedimentary rocks. Comprising an estimated 1016 tons of carbon, it is the most abundant source of organic compounds on earth, exceeding the total organic content of living matter 10,000-fold.  It is insoluble in normal organic solvents and it does not have a specific chemical formula. Upon heating, kerogen converts in part to liquid and gaseous hydrocarbons. Petroleum and natural gas form from kerogen. Kerogen may be classified by its origin: lacustrine (e.g., algal), marine (e.g., planktonic), and terrestrial (e.g., pollen and spores). The name "kerogen" was introduced by the Scottish organic chemist Alexander Crum Brown in 1906, derived from the Greek for "wax birth" (Greek: κηρός "wax" and -gen, γένεση "birth").

The increased production of hydrocarbons from shale has motivated a revival of research into the composition, structure, and properties of kerogen. Many studies have documented dramatic and systematic changes in kerogen composition across the range of thermal maturity relevant to the oil and gas industry. Analyses of kerogen are generally performed on samples prepared by acid demineralization with critical point drying, which isolates kerogen from the rock matrix without altering its chemical composition or microstructure.

Formation
Kerogen is formed during sedimentary diagenesis from the degradation of living matter. The original organic matter can comprise lacustrine and marine algae and plankton and terrestrial higher-order plants. During diagenesis, large biopolymers from, e.g., proteins, lipids, and carbohydrates in the original organic matter decompose partially or completely. This breakdown process can be viewed as the reverse of photosynthesis. These resulting units can then polycondense to form geopolymers. The formation of geopolymers in this way accounts for the large molecular weights and diverse chemical compositions associated with kerogen. The smallest units are the fulvic acids, the medium units are the humic acids, and the largest units are the humins. This polymerization usually happens alongside the formation and/or sedimentation of one or more mineral components resulting in a sedimentary rock like oil shale.

When kerogen is contemporaneously deposited with geologic material, subsequent sedimentation and progressive burial or overburden provide elevated pressure and temperature owing to lithostatic and geothermal gradients in Earth's crust. Resulting changes in the burial temperatures and pressures lead to further changes in kerogen composition including loss of hydrogen, oxygen, nitrogen, sulfur, and their associated functional groups, and subsequent isomerization and aromatization Such changes are indicative of the thermal maturity state of kerogen. Aromatization allows for molecular stacking in sheets, which in turn drives changes in physical characteristics of kerogen, such as increasing molecular density, vitrinite reflectance, and spore coloration (yellow to orange to brown to black with increasing depth/thermal maturity).

During the process of thermal maturation, kerogen breaks down in high-temperature pyrolysis reactions to form lower-molecular-weight products including bitumen, oil, and gas.  The extent of thermal maturation controls the nature of the product, with lower thermal maturities yielding mainly bitumen/oil and higher thermal maturities yielding gas. These generated species are partially expelled from the kerogen-rich source rock and in some cases can charge into a reservoir rock. Kerogen takes on additional importance in unconventional resources, particularly shale.  In these formations, oil and gas are produced directly from the kerogen-rich source rock (i.e. the source rock is also the reservoir rock). Much of the porosity in these shales is found to be hosted within the kerogen, rather than between mineral grains as occurs in conventional reservoir rocks. Thus, kerogen controls much of the storage and transport of oil and gas in shale.

Another possible method of formation is that Vanabin containing organisms cleave the core out of Chlorin based compounds such as the magnesium in Chlorophyll and replace it with their vanadium center in order to attach and harvest energy via Light Harvesting Complexes. It is theorized that the bacteria contained in worm castings, Rhodopseudomonas palustris, do this during its Photoautotrophism mode of metabolism. Over time colonies of light harvesting bacteria solidify, forming kerogen  .

Composition

Kerogen is a complex mixture of organic chemical compounds that make up the most abundant fraction of organic matter in sedimentary rocks. As kerogen is a mixture of organic materials, it is not defined by a single chemical formula. Its chemical composition varies substantially between and even within sedimentary formations. For example, kerogen from the Green River Formation oil shale deposit of western North America contains elements in the proportions carbon 215 : hydrogen 330 : oxygen 12 : nitrogen 5 : sulfur 1.

Kerogen is insoluble in normal organic solvents in part because of the high molecular weight of its component compounds. The soluble portion is known as bitumen. When heated to the right temperatures in the earth's crust, (oil window c. 50–150 °C, gas window c. 150–200 °C, both depending on how quickly the source rock is heated) some types of kerogen release crude oil or natural gas, collectively known as hydrocarbons (fossil fuels). When such kerogens are present in high concentration in rocks such as organic-rich mudrocks shale, they form possible source rocks. Shales that are rich in kerogen but have not been heated to required temperature to generate hydrocarbons instead may form oil shale deposits.

The chemical composition of kerogen has been analyzed by several forms of solid state spectroscopy. These experiments typically measure the speciations (bonding environments) of different types of atoms in kerogen. One technique is 13C NMR spectroscopy, which measures carbon speciation. NMR experiments have found that carbon in kerogen can range from almost entirely aliphatic (sp3 hybridized) to almost entirely aromatic (sp2 hybridized), with kerogens of higher thermal maturity typically having higher abundance of aromatic carbon. Another technique is Raman spectroscopy. Raman scattering is characteristic of, and can be used to identify, specific vibrational modes and symmetries of molecular bonds. The first-order Raman spectra of kerogen comprises two principal peaks; a so-called G band ("graphitic") attributed to in-plane vibrational modes of well-ordered sp2 carbon and a so-called D band ("disordered") from symmetric vibrational modes of sp2 carbon associated with lattice defects and discontinuities. The relative spectral position (Raman shift) and intensity of these carbon species is shown to correlate to thermal maturity, with kerogens of higher thermal maturity having higher abundance of graphitic/ordered aromatic carbons. Complementary and consistent results have been obtained with infrared (IR) spectroscopy, which show that kerogen has higher fraction of aromatic carbon and shorter lengths of aliphatic chains at higher thermal maturities. These results can be explained by the preferential removal of aliphatic carbons by cracking reactions during pyrolysis, where the cracking typically occurs at weak C-C bonds beta to aromatic rings and results in the replacement of a long aliphatic chain with a methyl group. At higher maturities, when all labile aliphatic carbons have already been removed—in other words, when the kerogen has no remaining oil-generation potential—further increase in aromaticity can occur from the conversion of aliphatic bonds (such as alicyclic rings) to aromatic bonds.

IR spectroscopy is sensitive to carbon-oxygen bonds such as quinones, ketones, and esters, so the technique can also be used to investigate oxygen speciation. It is found that the oxygen content of kerogen decreases during thermal maturation (as has also been observed by elemental analysis), with relatively little observable change in oxygen speciation. Similarly, sulfur speciation can be investigated with X-ray absorption near edge structure (XANES) spectroscopy, which is sensitive to sulfur-containing functional groups such as sulfides, thiophenes, and sulfoxides. Sulfur content in kerogen generally decreases with thermal maturity, and sulfur speciation includes a mix of sulfides and thiophenes at low thermal maturities and is further enriched in thiophenes at high maturities.
 
Overall, changes in kerogen composition with respect to heteroatom chemistry occur predominantly at low thermal maturities (bitumen and oil windows), while changes with respect to carbon chemistry occur predominantly at high thermal maturities (oil and gas windows).

Microstructure
The microstructure of kerogen also evolves during thermal maturation, as has been inferred by scanning electron microscopy (SEM) imaging showing the presence of abundant internal pore networks within the lattice of thermally mature kerogen. Analysis by gas sorption demonstrated that the internal specific surface area of kerogen increases by an order of magnitude (~ 40 to 400 m2/g) during thermal maturation. X-ray and neutron diffraction studies have examined the spacing between carbon atoms in kerogen, revealing during thermal maturation a shortening of carbon-carbon distances in covalently bonded carbons (related to the transition from primarily aliphatic to primarily aromatic bonding) but a lengthening of carbon-carbon distances in carbons at greater bond separations (related to the formation of kerogen-hosted porosity). This evolution is attributed to the formation of kerogen-hosted pores left behind as segments of the kerogen molecule are cracked off during thermal maturation.

Physical properties
These changes in composition and microstructure result in changes in the properties of kerogen.  For example, the skeletal density of kerogen increases from approximately 1.1 g/ml at low thermal maturity to 1.7 g/ml at high thermal maturity. This evolution is consistent with the change in carbon speciation from predominantly aliphatic (similar to wax, density < 1 g/ml) to predominantly aromatic (similar to graphite, density > 2 g/ml) with increasing thermal maturity.

Spatial heterogeneity
Additional studies have explored the spatial heterogeneity of kerogen at small length scales. Individual particles of kerogen arising from different inputs are identified and assigned as different macerals. This variation in starting material may lead to variations in composition between different kerogen particles, leading to spatial heterogeneity in kerogen composition at the micron length scale. Heterogeneity between kerogen particles may also arise from local variations in catalysis of pyrolysis reactions due to the nature of the minerals surrounding different particles.  Measurements performed with atomic force microscopy coupled to infrared spectroscopy (AFM-IR) and correlated with organic petrography have analyzed the evolution of the chemical composition and mechanical properties of individual macerals of kerogen with thermal maturation at the nanoscale. These results indicate that all macerals decrease in oxygen content and increase in aromaticity (decrease in aliphalicity) during thermal maturation, but some macerals undergo large changes while other macerals undergo relatively small changes.  In addition, macerals that are richer in aromatic carbon are mechanically stiffer than macerals that are richer in aliphatic carbon, as expected because highly aromatic forms of carbon (such as graphite) are stiffer than highly aliphatic forms of carbon (such as wax).

Types
Labile kerogen breaks down to generate principally liquid hydrocarbons (i.e., oil), refractory kerogen breaks down to generate principally gaseous hydrocarbons, and inert kerogen generates no hydrocarbons but forms graphite.

In organic petrography, the different components of kerogen can be identified by microscopic inspection and are classified as macerals. This classification was developed originally for coal (a sedimentary rock that is rich in organic matter of terrestrial origin) but is now applied to the study of other kerogen-rich sedimentary deposits.

The Van Krevelen diagram is one method of classifying kerogen by 'types', where kerogens form distinct groups when the ratios of hydrogen to carbon and oxygen to carbon are compared.

Type I: Algal/Sapropelic
Type I kerogens are characterized by high initial hydrogen-to-carbon (H/C) ratios and low initial oxygen-to-carbon (O/C) ratios. This kerogen is rich in lipid-derived material and is commonly, but not always, from algal organic matter in lacustrine (freshwater) environments. On a mass basis, rocks containing type I kerogen yield the largest quantity of hydrocarbons upon pyrolysis. Hence, from the theoretical view, shales containing type I kerogen are the most promising deposits in terms of conventional oil retorting.
 Hydrogen:carbon atomic ratio > 1.25
 Oxygen:carbon atomic ratio < 0.15
 Derived principally from lacustrine algae, deposited in anoxic lake sediments and rarely in marine environments
 Composed of alginite, amorphous organic matter, cyanobacteria, freshwater algae, and lesser of land plant resins
 Formed mainly from protein and lipid precursors
 Has few cyclic or aromatic structures
 Shows great tendency to readily produce liquid hydrocarbons (oil) under heating

Type II: Planktonic
Type II kerogens are characterized by intermediate initial H/C ratios and intermediate initial O/C ratios. Type II kerogen is principally derived from marine organic materials, which are deposited in reducing sedimentary environments. The sulfur content of type II kerogen is generally higher than in other kerogen types and sulfur is found in substantial amounts in the associated bitumen. Although pyrolysis of type II kerogen yields less oil than type I, the amount yielded is still sufficient for type II-bearing sedimentary deposits to be petroleum source rocks.
 Hydrogen:carbon atomic ratio < 1.25
 Oxygen:carbon atomic ratio 0.03 - 0.18
 Derived principally from marine plankton and algae
 Produces a mixture oil and gas under heating

Type II-S: Sulfurous
Similar to type II but with high sulfur content.

Type III: Humic
Type III kerogens are characterized by low initial H/C ratios and high initial O/C ratios. Type III kerogens are derived from terrestrial plant matter, specifically from precursor compounds including cellulose, lignin (a non-carbohydrate polymer formed from phenyl-propane units that binds the strings of cellulose together); terpenes and phenols. Coal is an organic-rich sedimentary rock that is composed predominantly of this kerogen type. On a mass basis, Type III kerogens generate the lowest oil yield of principal kerogen types.
 Hydrogen:carbon atomic ratio < 1
 Oxygen:carbon atomic ratio 0.03 - 0.3
 Has low hydrogen content because of abundant aromatic carbon structures
 Derived from terrestrial (land) plants
 Tends to produce gas under heating (Recent research has shown that Type III kerogens can actually produce oil under extreme conditions)

Type IV: Inert/Residual
Type IV kerogen comprises mostly inert organic matter in the form of polycyclic aromatic hydrocarbons. They have no potential to produce hydrocarbons.
 Hydrogen:carbon atomic ratio < 0.5

Kerogen cycle

The diagram on the right shows the organic carbon cycle with the flow of kerogen (black solid lines) and the flow of biospheric carbon (green solid lines) showing both the fixation of atmospheric CO2 by terrestrial and marine primary productivity. The combined flux of reworked kerogen and biospheric carbon into ocean sediments constitutes total organic carbon burial entering the endogenous kerogen pool.

Extra-terrestrial
Carbonaceous chondrite meteorites contain kerogen-like components. Such material is thought to have formed the terrestrial planets. Kerogen materials have been detected also in interstellar clouds and dust around stars.

The Curiosity rover has detected organic deposits similar to kerogen in mudstone samples in Gale Crater on Mars using a revised drilling technique. The presence of benzene and propane also indicates the possible presence of kerogen-like materials, from which hydrocarbons are derived.

See also
 
 
 
 
Deep inorganic origin of kerogen

References

Helgeson, H.C.et al. (2009). "A chemical and thermodynamic model of oil generation in hydrocarbon source rocks". Geochim. Cosmochim. Acta. 73, 594–695.

Marakushev, S.A.; Belonogova, O.V. (2021), "An inorganic origin of the “oil-source” rocks carbon substance". Georesursy = Georesources. 23, 164–176.

External links
 European Association of Organic Geochemists
 Organic Geochemistry (journal)
 Animation illustrating kerogene formation (approx t=50s) "Oil and Gas Formation" YouTube clip by EarthScience WesternAustralia

Petroleum
Oil shale geology
Petrology